The Grand Austrian State Prize is a decoration given annually by Austria to an artist for exceptional work. The recipient must be an Austrian citizen with a permanent residence in Austria.

It was originally created in 1950 by then education minister Felix Hurdes. The prize is given according to the recommendation by the Austrian Art Senate without a set rotation schedule for literature, music, visual art, or architecture. Since 2003 it has been endowed with a 30,000 euro prize. In the areas of film and artistic photography, the prize is awarded according to a jury and not the Art Senate.

Since 1971, the prize has been given to only one person a year, instead of sometimes given to multiple people in different categories.

Recipients

Literature

Music

Visual Art

Architecture

Artistic Photography

References

External links
 

Austrian art
Arts awards in Austria
Architecture awards